Strictly Phiysical may refer to:

Strictly Physical (album), a 2007 album by Monrose
"Strictly Physical" (song), a song from the album above